Parliamentary elections were held in Ivory Coast on 12 April 1959 as a prelude to independence the next year. The Democratic Party of Ivory Coast – African Democratic Rally was the only party to contest the election, thereby winning all 100 seats. Voter turnout was 94.7%.

Results

References

Ivory
Elections in Ivory Coast
1959 in Ivory Coast
One-party elections
April 1959 events in Africa